Mario Salvini (Reggio Emilia, 1863 – Florence, 1940) was an Italian ceramist and sculptor.

He was born in Reggio Emilia, but he had studied at the Florentine Accademia di Belle Arti, and in that city he had established the Salvini ceramic factory.

Among his works displayed at the 1885 Exposition della Società d'Incoraggiamento of Fine Arts in Florence was a stucco model depicting: Night of Gold. In the next year, at the same Exposition, he exhibited a stucco statue: Jugurtha in the Tullian Prison. At Venice, in 1887, Guida; Sciopero. At Bologna, in 1888, he exhibited a project of a bronze fountain, produced in the foundry of Giuseppe Pellas of Florence.

He also exhibited and traveled to the Chicago exposition, and was involved in the production of export ceramics. He exhibited his floral designs at the International Exposition of Turin in 1902. e gradually turned to teaching, and in 1919, he obtained a professorship at the Scuola d'Arte of Veniced, then at the Florentine Istituto d'Arte, where he taught till 1934. His sonse include Celso (Fiesole, 1889 - Florence 1947), a critic of dramatic theater, and Guido (Florence 1893–1965), scenographer.

References

1863 births
1940 deaths
People from Reggio Emilia
Italian ceramists
20th-century Italian sculptors
20th-century Italian male artists
19th-century Italian sculptors
Italian male sculptors
19th-century Italian male artists